The Dzierzgoń is a river in northern Poland.

It starts west of Morąg in the Warmian-Masurian Voivodeship and empties into Lake Drużno, which is drained by the river Elbląg, south of the city of Elbląg.

The town of Dzierzgoń lies on the river.

Rivers of Poland
Rivers of Warmian-Masurian Voivodeship